The prime minister of Greenland, officially the premier of Greenland, is the head of government of Greenland, a constituent country part of the Kingdom of Denmark. The prime minister is usually leader of the majority party in the Parliament of Greenland. Jonathan Motzfeldt became the first prime minister after home rule was granted to Greenland in 1979. The incumbent prime minister is Múte Bourup Egede.

List of prime ministers of Greenland

Timeline

See also
List of governors of Greenland

References

Greenland, List of Prime Ministers of
 
Prime Ministers of Greenland